Russell Simmons presents Def Poetry, better known as simply Def Poetry Jam or Def Poetry, is a spoken word poetry television series hosted by Mos Def and airing on HBO between 2002 and 2007. The series features performances by established and up-and-coming spoken word poets. Performances also include special appearances by well-known actors and musicians, as well as occasional performances by Mos Def himself. Co-created by Bruce George, Danny Simmons, Deborah Pointer, Stan Lathan, and Russell Simmons, the show is a spin-off of the popular Def Comedy Jam which began airing on HBO in the 1990s. As with Def Comedy, Simmons appears at the end of every episode to thank the audience.

The series included historical legendary poets such as, The Last Poets, Nikki Giovanni, Amiri Baraka and Sonya Sanchez.  It also featured poets, Saul Williams, J. Ivy, Jessica Care-Moore and Lemon. Though technically not a poetry slam, Def Poetry has become heavily associated with the poetry slam movement, and utilizes many of poetry slam's best known poets, including National Poetry Slam champions such as Beau Sia, Taylor Mali, Big Poppa E, Mayda del Valle, Mike Mcgee, Alix Olson and Rives, among others. Even poets who are critical of the poetry slam, such as John S. Hall, have acknowledged slam's influence on the show. In a 2005 interview, Hall was quoted as saying:

In a 2005 interview, Bob Holman, who founded the Nuyorican Poets Cafe's poetry slam and appeared on Season 4 of the show, applauded Def Poetry, noting:

However, Marc Smith, the founder of the Poetry Slam movement, is more critical of the program. Smith decries the intense commercialization of the poetry slam, and refers to Def Poetry as "an exploitive entertainment [program that] diminished the value and aesthetic of performance poetry."

In November 2002, a live stage production, Russell Simmons Def Poetry Jam, opened on Broadway. Directed by Stan Lathan, the show featured poets Beau Sia, Suheir Hammad, Staceyann Chin, Lemon, Mayda del Valle, Georgia Me, Black Ice, Poetri Smith, and Steve Coleman. The show ran on Broadway until May 2003, and won a 2003 Tony Award for Best Special Theatrical Event. The show subsequently toured both nationally and internationally.

Def Poetry premiered on HBO in 2002 and the latest season to air (Season 6) premiered in February 2007. As of summer 2008, there has been no word about the possibility of a Season 7. Starting in 2008, producers of Def Poetry (including Simmons, Stan Lathan, and Kamilah Forbes) developed and broadcast the HBO poetry show Brave New Voices, which is stylistically similar to Def Poetry, with teenage poets competing and backstage scenes.

Episode index

Season 1 (2002)

Episode 1
Steve Colman – I Wanna Hear a Poem
Georgia Me – Full Figure Potential
Vanessa Hidary - Culture Bandit
Lemon – Shine
Nikki Giovanni – Talk to Me Poem, I Think I've Got the Blues
Black Ice – Bigger Than Mine?
Suheir Hammad – First Writing Since

Episode 2
Taylor Mali – What Teachers Make
Yellow Rage – Listen Asshole
 Jewel – Poem Song
Flow Mentalz – They Call Me Drama
Sonia Sanchez – Poem to Some Women
Shihan – This Type Love
Dawn Saylor – When I Was 14
Kayo – Who Am I?

Episode 3
 Cedric the Entertainer – Untitled
 Sarah Jones – Your Revolution
 Beau Sia – Give Me a Chance
 Willie Perdomo – How Beautiful We Really Are
Abyss – God Gave Me Grey Skies
 The Last Poets – Take Your Time
IN-Q – When Hip-Hop Was Fun
 J. Ivy – I Need To Write

Episode 4

 Mayda del Valle – Descendancy
 Poetri – Money
 Jessica Care Moore – Warriors Walk Alone
 Dave Chappelle – The Corner Store
 Amiri Baraka – from Why is We Americans?
 Liza Jessie Peterson – Ice Cream Fiend
 Kevin Coval – Family Feud

Season 2 (2003)

Episode 1

Beau Sia – Asian Invasion
Jason Carney – Southern Heritage
Thea Monyee – Woman to Woman
Sekou Sundiata – Come on and Bring on the Reparations
Marty McConnell – Give Me One Good Reason to Die
Twin Poets – Dreams are Illegal in the Ghetto
 Jamie Foxx – Off the Hizzle for Shizzle

Episode 2

 Danny Hoch – Corner Talk, September
 Patricia Smith – Skinhead
 Dante Basco – Nikki
 Maggie Estep – Emotional Idiot
 Black Ice – Truth Is
 Kent Foreman – Epiphany
 Roger Bonair-Agard – How the Ghetto Loves Us Back
 Erykah Badu – Friends, fans, and artists must meet

Episode 3

 Lemon – Where I'm From and A Toast
 Bassey Ikpi – Sometimes silence is the loudest kind of noise
 Taylor Mali – Totally like whatever, you know?
 Regie Cabico – What kind of guys are attracted to me
 Haki R. Madhubuti – The B Network
 Rat Sack – I'm Losing You
 Talib Kweli –

Episode 4

 Ishle Yi Park – All I have ever done is write you love poems
 Shihan – Say What?
 Suheir Hammad – Not Your Erotic, Not Your Exotic
 Big Poppa E – Wussy Boy
 La Bruja – WTC
 Anthony Morales – Story Avenue Stuck
 Amalia Ortiz – Some Days
 Oscar Brown Jr. – I Apologize

Episode 5

 Felipe Luciano – Jibaro, My Pretty Nigger
 MuMs – Ploylessness
 Amanda Diva – Hot Shit
 Malik Yusef – I Spit
 Asha Bandele – Morning Was My Mentor
 Malcolm Jamal Warner – I Love My Woman

Episode 6

 Sekou the Misfit – I'm a Rapper
 Steve Connell – Why Not Wine Coolers
 Georgia Me – NigGods
 Louis Reyes Rivera – Bullet Cry
 Jessica Care Moore – I'm a Hip Hop Cheerleader
 Keith Murray – Man Child.

Episode 7

 Denizen Kane – Lost and Found
 Staceyann Chin – If Only Out of Vanity
 Big Rube – Alphabet Acrobat
 Wood Harris – Night Song
 Goldie – No title
 Regie Gibson – For James Marshall Hendrix
 Joy Harjo – A Poem to Get Rid of Fear
 Linton Kwesi Johnson – If I Was a Top-notch Poet

Season 3 (2004)

Episode 1

 Black Ice – Lone Soldier
 Rives – Sign Language
 Helena D. Lewis – Stank Breath
 Poem-cees – Power
 Mutabaruka – Dis Poem
 Daniel Beaty – Duality Duel
 Rupert Estanislao – Empress
 Jill Scott – Nothing is for Nothing
Suheir Hammad – We Spent the 4th of July in Bed

Episode 2

 Mayda del Valle and Lemon – Tito Puente
Flaco Navaja – Kids Don't Play
 Gemineye – Poetic Bloodline
 Ursula Rucker – Get Ready
 Michael Ellison – Light Skin-did
Ishle Park – Pussy
 Ras Baraka – American Poem
 Dana Gilmore – Wife, Woman, Friend
 Common – God is Freedom

Episode 3

 Poetri – Krispy Kreme
 Emanuel Xavier – Tradiciones
 Marc Bamuthi Joseph – For Pop
 Richard Montoya – Miami
 Vanessa Hidary – The Hebrew Mamita
 Danny Hoch – PSA
 Bassey Ikpi – Homeward
 Lemon – Gangsta MCs
 Steve Colman – Terrorist Threat

Episode 4

 Black Ice & Staceyann Chin – Jammin
 Rock Baby – Titty Man
 Alix Olson – Women Before
 Mike 360 – Twilight Zone
 Cheryl James – We Follow Your Lead
 Shappy – I Am That Nerd
 Jonzi D – 3000 Casualties of War
Amalia Ortiz – Cat Calls
Jimmy Santiago Baca – from Healing Earthquakes ("Twelve")

Episode 5

 Roger Bonair-Agard  – For Trent Lott
 Frenchie – Fucking Ain't Conscious
 Geoff Trenchard – Of Copper Chipped Teeth
 Chinaka Hodge – Barely Audible
Quincy Troupe – Forty One Seconds in June, in Salt Lake City, Utah (for Michael Jordan)
 Dufflyn – Single Life
 MuMs – Brooklyn Queen
 Kevin Coval – Jam Master J
 Beau Sia – Love

Episode 6

 Shihan – Sick and Tired
 Jason Carney – Out Here
 Gina Loring – Somewhere There Is a Poem
 Kanye West – Self Conscious
 Jamie Kennedy – Grim Fairy Tale
 Bao Phi – You Bring Out the Vietnamese in Me
 Roscoe P. Coldchain – Trouble
 Mayda del Valle – Mami's Makin' Mambo
 Buju Banton – How Long

Episode 7

 Maggie Estep – Happy
 Malak Salaam – Warrior's Love
 Joel Chmara – Sweet Tooth Tollbooth School Year
 Flowmentalz – The Payphone
 Saul Williams – Coded Language
 Georgia Me – Hit Like a Man
 Deb Young – Children of a Lesser God
 Smokey Robinson – A Black American

Season 4 (2005)

Episode 1

 Daniel Beaty – Knock, Knock
 Rives – Kite
 Nafessa Monroe – White
 Mark Gonzales – As with Most Men
 Zena Edwards – Laugh
 Oscar Brown Jr. – Children of Children
Amalia Ortiz – Women of Juarez
 Black Ice – Or Die
 MC Lyte – I Was Born

Episode 2

 Gemineye – What Are You Fighting For?
 Bonnie – My Man
Javon Johnson – Elementary
Suheir Hammad – What I Will
 Rachel and George McKibbons – Multi-tasking
Vanessa Hidary – Fling Gone Awry
 Flowmentalz – Constipation
Nikki Patin – Sweat
Nikky Finney – Girlfriends Train
Kanye West – 18 years

Episode 3

 Bassey Ikpi – Diallo
John S. Hall – America Kicks Ass
Tish Benson – Fifth Word Email
Kelly Tsai – Mao
 Tracy Morgan – Feeling Fucked Up
 Will Bell – So I Run
Morris Stegosaurus – Big Man II
 Dawn Saylor – Take You To Brooklyn
 Michael Eric Dyson – Intellectual MCs
 KRS-One and Doug E. Fresh – 2nd Quarter

Episode 4

 Poetri – Dating Myself
 Julian Curry – Nigger, Niggas, Niggaz
 Ishle Park – Open Letter to Soldier
 Taylor Mali – Like Lily Like Wilson
 Adele Givens – That Shit Ain't Funny
 Kevin Coval – My g-dself Loose
 Yolanda Kae Wilkinson – Circa Valentine's Day
Amir Sulaiman – Danger
 Floetry – Everybody Heard

Episode 5

 Lemon – Love Poem
 Regie Cabico – You Bring Out the Writer in Me
 Rafael Casal – Abortion
 Kim Fields – How Come
 Reg E. Gaines – I Don't Feel Like Writing
 Jon Goode – Barbara
 Dana Gilmore – Wife, Woman, Friend, Pt. 2
 Rita Dove – Black on a Saturday Night
 Talib Kweli – Lonely People

Episode 6

 Flaco Navaja – Revolution
Liza Jesse Peterson – Waitress
 Robert Karimi – Get Down with Your Catholic Muslim Self
 Triple Black – Love Poems
 Bonafide Rojas – In front of the Class
 Laura "Piece" Kelly – Central District
 BessKepp – Rotten Pomegranates
 Michael Franti – Rock the Nation
 Ruby Dee – Tupac

Episode 7

 Georgia Me – Bitch Ass Nigga
 Jus Cus – Homeland Security
 J. Ivy – Dear Father
 Marlon Esquerra – Morning Papers
 Marvin Tate – My Life to the Present
 Martin Espada – Imagine the Angels of Bread
 Alix Olson – America on Sale
 Mos Def – Pornographic Content
 Ani DiFranco – Coming Up
Mike Epps – I Love the Hood

Episode 8

 Mayda del Valle – Hood Days
 Andy Buck – *69
 Faraji Salim – Star Spangled Banner
 Bob Holman – Rock & Roll Mythology
 Patrick Washington – Letter to the Editor
 Tara Betts – Switch
 Paul Flores – Brown Dreams
 muMs – The Truth Parts I & II
 Buttaflysoul – Queer Eye
 Dead Prez – 4 the Hood

Episode 9

Beau Sia – I'm So Deep
Aysiha Knight – Until
 Buddy Wakefield – Convenience Store
 Shihan – The Auction Network
 Miguel Algarin – Met Walking
 Kendra Urdang – To Every Man Who Never Called Himself a Feminist
 Speech – Night Time Demons
 Red Storm – My Debut
 Universes (poetic theatre ensemble) (Steven, Mildred & Gamal) – Don't Front
 Common – A Letter to the Law

Episode 10

 Tommy Bottoms – Basic Economics
 Staceyann Chin – Three Frenzied Days
 Joe Hernandez-Kolski – Cool
 Marc Batmuthi Joseph – Move
 Denizen Kane – Love Song
 Aya De Leon – Cellulite
 Musiq – Pieces of this Life
 Mos Def – My Life is Real
 Yusef Komunyakaa – The Sure Beat
 Beau Sia, Georgia Me, Suheir Hammad – First Taste

Season 5 (2006)

Episode 1

 J. Ivy – Never Let Me Down
 Dahlak Brathwaite – Just Another Routine Check
 Claudia Alick – Employed Poor
 Black Ice – Imagine
 Gideon Grody-Patinkin – Touching
 Avery Brooks – from Purlie Victorious (by Ossie Davis)
 Lauryn Hill – Motives and Thoughts
 Rachel McKibbens – After School Special
 Dave Chappelle – Fuck Ashton Kutcher and How I Got the Lead On Jeopardy

Episode 2

 Al Letson – The Ball the Rim and Him
 Dan Sully and Tim Stafford – Death From Below
 Georgia Me – For Your Protection
 John Legend – Again
 Caroline Harvey – Spoons
 Bounty Killer – Look Into My Eyes;
 Bassey Ikpi – I Want to Kiss You
 Will "Da Real One" Bell – Diary of the Reformed
 Alicia Keys – P.O.W.

Episode 3

 Reg E. Gaines and Savion Glover – Pawn Shop
 Tommy Chunn – Computer Wordplay
 Scorpio Blues – Second Guessing
 Gemineye – Penny for Your Thoughts
 Emanuel Xavier – Nueva York
 Mayda del Valle – To All the Boys I've Loved Before
 Rev. Run – Peter Piper
 Aulelei Love – Same Cell, A Poem for Women in Prison
 Mike Booker – Hoodology
 Smokey Robinson – Gang Bangin'

Episode 4

 The Poem-cees – Cheatin'
 Geoff Trenchard – Ode to my Bathroom
 Marty McConnell – Instructions for a Body
 Nikki Giovanni – Nikki-Rosa
 Roger Bonair-Agard – Calypso
 Joaquin Zihuatanejo – This is a Suit
 Ishle Park – Sa-I-Gu
 Willie Perdomo – Nigger-Reecan Blues
 Floetry x2 – Fantasize

Episode 5

 Poetri – Driving
 Sharrif Simmons— Fuck What You Heard
 Michael D. Ellison – Mezeker Means to Remember
 Phylicia Rashad – On Status (by Vivian Ayers)
 Ratsack – Free the Toes
 Abyss – She
 Kevin Coval – Nothing Fight
 Mollie Angelheart – Psychotic Bitch
 Flomentalz – Talkin' to God
 Thea Monyee and Gaknew – A Different World

Episode 6

 Wyclef Jean – Immigrant
 Nayeli Adorador-Knudsen – Priceless
 Michael Cirelli – Love Song for Kelis
 M'Reld – Ready for Love
 Red Storm – Snake in the Grass
 Kelly Tsai – Aftershocks
 Paul Mabon – The Toothbrush
 Kevin Derrig – Andrew
 Mighty Mike McGee – Like
 Narubi Selah – Uncle Benz
 Ise Lyfe – Popular Dirt

Episode 7

 Kanye West – Bittersweet
 Ursula Rucker – What a Woman Must Do
 Rafael Casal – Barbie and Ken 101
 Terry Creech – Lost Bird
 Thadra Sheridan – Bad Boyfriend
 Beau Sia – Hip Hop
 Shihan – In Response
 Sonia Sanchez – Our Vision Is Our Voice
 Amir Sulaiman – She Said, I Prefer A Broken Neck...
 Lemon and Flaco – Boriquas

Episode 8

 Preach R Sun – Cotton
 Steve Connell and Sekou The Misfit – America Calls
 Big Poppa E – Poem For A Friend
 Amanda Diva – 40 Emcees
 Al B. Back – Super Negro
 Sista Queen – Try Being A Lady
 Jerry Quickley – 3-Part Bitter X-girlfriend #167249-B
 Oscar Brown, Jr. – This Beach
 Staceyann Chin – A City In Tragedy
 Brother J – Atlan
 Common – Be Known

Episode 9

 Suheir Hammad – Mike Check
 Lemon – Poor People
 Tamara Blue – Thick Chicks
 Rives – Op-talk
 Otep Shamaya– Dedicated To My Enemy
 Heru Ptah – Why
 Sharon Olds – Self Portrait, Rear View
 Perre Shelton – Dandelion
 Consequence – Friend Zone
 Jason Carney – Our Soldiers
 Black Thought – Untitled

Episode 10

 Gina Loring – You Move Me
 Rock Baby – That Sweet That Funk
 Chinaka Hodge – Cousin
 Denizen Kane – Patriot Act
 Sekou Sundiata – Amman
 Kristiana Colon – From the Clay
 Jimmy Tran – Mediocre Penis
 Flaco Navaja – Dimple
 Eve Ensler – My Father's House
 Black Ice, Poetri and Shihan – We Are Men

Season 6 (2007)

Episode 1

 DMX – The Industry
 Big Mike – Sexy
 Asia – The Waiting Hour
 Dan Vaughn & Dasha Kelly – Six Million
 Kelly Tsai – Grey Matter
 Red Storm – Black Barbie Doll
 Shanelle Gabriel – Why I Love You
 Idris Goodwin – What is They Feedin' Our Kids
 Jill Scott – Ain't a Ceiling

Episode 2

 Dahlak Braithwaite – Peculiar Evolution
 Skim – Your Eyes
 Eamon Mahone & Paul Graham – Black Irish
 Tahani Salah – Hate
 George Watsky – V For Virgin
 Shannon Leigh – Sudanese Children
 Pat's Justice – Innocent Criminal
 Lyfe Jennings – Rough Stuff
 Matisyahu – Late Night In The Field
 Talib Kweli – Hell

Episode 3

 Sarah Kay – Hands
 Riva & Sciryl – My Best Friend (Hip Hop)
 Rafael Casal – First Week Of A Break-Up
 Meilani Clay – Lost
 Shihan – Father's Day
 Shannon Matesky – My Space
 Carlos Andres Gomez – What's Genocide
 Carole King – Touchstone
 Natalie Stewart – Her Story
 Jamal Joseph – Ricky Do & The 4th Of July

Episode 4

 Oveous Maximus – Salcedo's Breakdown
 Sonya Renee Taylor – Connections
 Anis Mojgani – For Those Who Can Still Ride an Airplane for the First Time
 Rives – Dirty Talk
 Mush – Next Wednesday
 Joe Hernandez-Kolski – No Disclaimers
 African-American Shakespear – Will You Be There
 David Banner – What About Us
 Sunni Patterson – We Made It

Episode 5

 Big Poppa E – Propers
 Bassey Ikpi – Apology To My Unborn
 Alvin Lau – What Tiger Said
 Saddi Kali – Goin' Platinum In 2 Days
 Liza Garza – My Everything
 Lamont Carey – I Can't Read
 Brian Dykstra – Pushing Bush
 Vanessa Hidary – Phd In Him
 Basikknowledge – Numbers
 George Clinton – Dope Dog

Episode 6

 Black Ice – The Ugly Show
 Mayda Del Valle – The porn industry
 Steve Colman – I Want To Eat Your Pu**y
 Georgia Me – The Promiseland
 Beau Sia – Back To The Now
 Staceyann Chin – Nails
 Poetri – Monsters In My Stomach
 Suheir Hammad – Daddy's Song
 Lemon – Experience
 Nelly Furtado – Nevis

Reboot
Chance the Rapper will host this season.

References

External links
 
 
 Is There A Future For Spoken Word? @ dropmagazine.com

Works about slam poetry
HBO original programming
2002 American television series debuts
2007 American television series endings
English-language television shows
Hip hop television
Def Jam Recordings